The Moti Shahi Mahal is a palace built by the Mughal emperor Shahjahan between 1618 and 1622. It now hosts the Sardar Vallabhbhai Patel National Memorial, which is a museum and exhibition centre dedicated to Vallabhbhai Patel located in Shahibaug, Ahmedabad, Gujarat, near Civil Hospital, Ahmedabad. It is surrounded by well laid gardens.

History
Sardar vallabhbhai Patel national memorial is one of the popular museums which is being dedicated to the great Sardar vallabhbhai Patel. This museum is situated at the shahibag of Ahmedabad (Gujarat). Museum of Sardar vallabhbhai Patel was constructed in the year 1980.
 The palace was built in 1622 by the Mughal Emperor Shah Jahan (1616-1622) to give work to the poor during a season of scarcity. The Shahibaug gardens of the palace were in the seventeenth century famous, the resort of the whole city, and one of its chief ornaments. A century and a half later (1781), though the well was in ruins and the fountains and water-courses broken, the gardens could still boast of some noble cypresses, cedars, palms, sandals, and cassias, with mango, tamarind, and other spreading fruit trees. Besides the gardens, there was, a little beyond, an older garden called the Andhari Badi, or dark garden, with large ruins. The palace, always kept in good repair, is thus described by Col. James Grant Forbes in 1781:   At a little distance from the royal mansion, on the bank of the Sabarmati river, with separate gardens, baths and fountains, was the zanana or ladies' palace. In 1638 the Shahi Baug was very large, shut in by a great wall with ditches full of water, a beautiful house, and very rich rooms. In 1666 Thevenot found the King's garden filled with a variety of trees. The road lay through an avenue like those in Paris. The garden was very large or rather there were several gardens rising like an amphitheatre. There were four wonderful walks fringed, on either side right across the garden, by a terrace full of flowers and meeting in the form of a cross, where was a great building with a roof covered with green tiles.

The palace was later controlled by the British Raj when the Ahmedabad Cantonment was established in the mid-nineteenth century, and used for government purposes. To the original centre saloon, two large wings and several rooms and terraces were, about 1835, added by Mr. Williams, of the Civil Service. The apartments for the officers and attendants of the court were still further detached. In the great flood of 1875 the strong stone wall, which prevents the river from passing south towards the city, was slightly damaged, and sand was washed over it covering and destroying the garden beds.

Following Indian independence, this palace was the Raj Bhavan - an official residence of the governor of Gujarat, from 1960 to 1978. It was endowed by the Government of Gujarat in 1975, upon the centennial birth anniversary of Sardar Vallabhbhai Patel, to establish a memorial to honour him. The memorial was founded on 7 March 1980.

Architecture
Moti Shahi Mahal is an example of Mughal architecture. According to historian James Douglas, it inspired Shahjahan to build the Taj Mahal later.  Four pillars mark the four wings, one floor and the central hall of the palace.

Memorials

Sardar Patel

The Vallabhbhai Patel memorial is located on the ground floor, covering the central hall and four adjacent rooms. The central hall is filled with portraits of Patel, his family, friends and colleagues in the Indian freedom struggle. They are in chronological order and with biographical descriptions of periods of his life, and quotes by his colleagues and admirers. Two of the four adjacent rooms house relics of Patel's life, his personal possessions as well as displayed accounts and political cartoons from newspapers of the time. One room is devoted to a particular phase of Patel's work - his comradeship with Mohandas Gandhi in the 1930s, his youth, education and legal career, and his work as India's home minister in integrating princely states into India. In a room to the right of the main entrance into the palace, is where Patel's personal effects are on display. These include his khadi kurta, jacket and dhoti, his shoes, slippers and European-style clothes from his younger days. Also on display is a flag of India as created by the Indian National Congress in 1930-31.

Mahatma Gandhi
In a room connected through the Sardar Sarovar hall, the life and work of Mahatma Gandhi are on display. These include portraits, pictures, quotes, busts, statues and books. Gandhi's close partnership and personal friendship with Patel is an important and recurrent theme throughout the memorial.

Tagore
Rabindranath Tagore, Bengali poet, writer and philosopher stayed in the palace in 1878, when he was seventeen years old. He wrote his only ghost story, The Hungry Stones and his first song here.

On the first floor in the right wing of the palace, is the room where Rabindranath Tagore lived during his time at the palace, and it is dedicated to his memory. It is accessed by a staircase and a pathway into the right column. There are numerous portraits, pictures and information on display, and the main room consists of a large statue of Tagore, including paintings to preserve his memory and contributions.

Exhibits

Sardar Sarovar Project

A major room and sub-hall on the ground floor is devoted to the Sardar Sarovar Project - a major dam and hydroelectric power plants project on the Narmada River valley, covering the states of Gujarat, Maharashtra and Madhya Pradesh. The room contains pictures, graphics, books, statistics and other information on the project - from its inception, technical details, construction and present functioning.

Renovation
In 2012 the Government of India provided funding of the structure, however subsequently the Gujarat High Court ordered a pause of the renovation work.

References

External links

 Sardar Patel Museum

Museums in Ahmedabad
Palaces in Gujarat
Monuments and memorials in Gujarat
Biographical museums in India
Vallabhbhai Patel
Memorials to Vallabhbhai Patel